

440001–440100 

|-bgcolor=#f2f2f2
| colspan=4 align=center | 
|}

440101–440200 

|-bgcolor=#f2f2f2
| colspan=4 align=center | 
|}

440201–440300 

|-bgcolor=#f2f2f2
| colspan=4 align=center | 
|}

440301–440400 

|-bgcolor=#f2f2f2
| colspan=4 align=center | 
|}

440401–440500 

|-id=411
| 440411 Piovani ||  || Nicola Piovani (born 1946), an Italian light-classical musician and film score composer, who won the Academy Award for his score of the Italian movie Life Is Beautiful (original title: La vita è bella) in 1999. || 
|}

440501–440600 

|-bgcolor=#f2f2f2
| colspan=4 align=center | 
|}

440601–440700 

|-bgcolor=#f2f2f2
| colspan=4 align=center | 
|}

440701–440800 

|-bgcolor=#f2f2f2
| colspan=4 align=center | 
|}

440801–440900 

|-bgcolor=#f2f2f2
| colspan=4 align=center | 
|}

440901–441000 

|-bgcolor=#f2f2f2
| colspan=4 align=center | 
|}

References 

440001-441000